Flemington Township is an inactive township in Polk County, in the U.S. state of Missouri.

Flemington Township takes its name from Flemington, Missouri.

References

Townships in Missouri
Townships in Polk County, Missouri